Ian Walsh is the name of:

 Ian Walsh (rugby league) (1933–2013), Australian former rugby league footballer and coach
 Ian Walsh (Fair City character), character in soap opera Fair City
 Ian Walsh (footballer) (born 1958), former Wales international footballer
 Ian Walsh (ice hockey) (born 1972), National Hockey League referee